Jonathan Amar D'Laryea (born 3 September 1985) is an English footballer who plays as a midfielder for Newark and Sherwood United, where he is also the clubs manager.

Beginning his career with Manchester City, he went on to make over 90 appearances in the Football League for Mansfield Town between 2005 and 2008. went on to forge a career in Non-league football and has played for Northwich Victoria, Eastwood Town, North Ferriby United, Gainsborough Trinity and Long Eaton United and AFC Mansfield.

Club career
D'Laryea is a graduate of Manchester City's Academy where he signed for the club at aged 9, he made one senior appearance for Manchester City in a League Cup defeat against Arsenal in October 2004. He joined Mansfield Town in October 2005 on an initial one-month loan, which was extended by a further two months. After impressing during the loan spell, D'Laryea joined Mansfield Town for a nominal fee on a two-and-a-half-year contract in January 2006. An ankle injury sustained in the summer of 2007 kept D'Laryea out of the side until November 2007, but by the end of the 2007–08 season, D'Laryea had made over 100 appearances in all competitions for Mansfield. After Mansfield Town were relegated to the Conference National at the end of the 2007–08 season, D'Laryea was released by the club but later signed a new contract after impressing new manager, Billy McEwan.

On 23 November, D'Laryea signed permanently for Northwich Victoria after a successful loan spell. On 18 February 2010, D'Laryea signed for Eastwood Town. D'Laryea signed for Conference North side Gainsborough Trinity in June 2011. Following the completion of the 2012 season Jonathan signed for another year with Trinity. In May 2013 he joined North Ferriby United. After 2 years with North Ferriby, D'Laryea re-joined Gainsborough Trinity for the 2015–16 season. D'Laryea announced following Trinity's 4–1 victory over Bradford Park Avenue on the final game of the season that he would be retiring from football. However, he signed for AFC Mansfield a few weeks later.

Having spent three seasons and amassing over 145 appearances for AFC Mansfield, D'Laryea moved on to Long Eaton United before moving back to AFC on 2 March 2020.

International career
On 27 August, D'Laryea received an England C call up by manager Paul Fairclough along with his Mansfield Town teammate Nathan Arnold.

Coaching career
On 12 November 2022, following the departure of Nathan Arnold, D'Laryea became player/manager of Newark & Sherwood United.

Personal life
His twin brother, Nathan, was also a professional footballer. The D'Laryea brothers are of Ghanaian descent. Johnathan and his twin brother also studied high school at Stretford Grammar School

References

External links
 

1985 births
Living people
Footballers from Manchester
English footballers
Association football midfielders
Manchester City F.C. players
Mansfield Town F.C. players
Northwich Victoria F.C. players
Eastwood Town F.C. players
Gainsborough Trinity F.C. players
North Ferriby United A.F.C. players
A.F.C. Mansfield players
Long Eaton United F.C. players
English Football League players
National League (English football) players
English people of Ghanaian descent
Twin sportspeople
English twins